Typhlonectidae, also known as aquatic caecilians or rubber eels, are a family of caecilians found east of the Andes in South America.

They are viviparous animals, giving birth to young that possess external gills. Of the five genera in the family, Atretochoana, Potamotyphlus and Typhlonectes are entirely aquatic, while Chthonerpeton and Nectocaecilia are semiaquatic.

Taxonomy

Genus Atretochoana
Atretochoana eiselti
Genus Chthonerpeton
Chthonerpeton arii
Chthonerpeton braestrupi
Chthonerpeton exile
Chthonerpeton indistinctum
Chthonerpeton noctinectes
Chthonerpeton onorei
Chthonerpeton perissodus
Chthonerpeton viviparum
Genus Nectocaecilia
Nectocaecilia petersii
Genus Potamotyphlus
Potamotyphlus kaupii
Genus Typhlonectes
Typhlonectes compressicauda
Typhlonectes natans

References

 
Amphibian families